This list is limited to bombings and does not include other forms of attacks.

January 
 January 2: A truck bomb killed 19 people in Baghdad.
 January 5: 20 people were killed in a series of bombings targeting a Shiite suburb.
January 15: 75 people were killed in a series of bombings in Baghdad and Baquba.
January 18: A series of car bombings killed 30 people in Anbar province.
January 30: Six suicide bombers entered an Iraqi ministry building and killed 24 people before security forces regained control.

February 
February 10: 22 people were killed when a terrorist accidentally blew himself up while demonstrating how to use an explosive belt.
February 13: Two bombs killed 6 people and wounded 18 in Baghdad.
February 18: 33 people were killed in a wave of car bombs in Baghdad.

March 

March 9: At least 32 people were killed when a minibus packed with explosives exploded at a checkpoint in the city of Hilla.
March 27: Bombings killed 33 people in Baghdad.

April 
April 9: Car bombs killed 24 people across Iraq.
April 20: Car bombs and a suicide bomber killed 9 people and injured 39 others.
April 28: A suicide bomber killed 25 people in Khanaqi.

May 
May 13: A wave of car bombs targeting Shiites killed at least 34 people.
May 22: At least 24 Shia pilgrims were killed in three bombings in Baghdad.
May 27: A suicide bomber killed 17 people in Baghdad.

June 
June 8: At least 18 people were killed in a bombing attacking the office of Jalal Talabani's Kurdish political party.
June 9: At least 30 people were killed in a double bombing targeting the offices of a Kurdish political party.
June 15: 9 people were killed and 20 wounded after an attack near Tahrir Square. Further bombs went off after nightfall killing 3 people.
June 25: A suicide bomber blew himself up outside a market in Baghdad killing 13 people and wounding 25

July 
July 4: A suicide bomber detonated a vehicle at a security forces position north of Baghdad killing 15.
July 9: Three car bombs exploded in front of a court in Hilia killing five and wounding 17.
July 11: 28 people died following a suicide bombing in Kirkut.
July 23: A suicide bombing killed 33 people in Baghdad.
July 24: A car bomb killed 21 people in Baghdad.

August 
August 23: A series of bombings killed 35 people across Iraq.
August 26: A car bomb killed 10 people in Baghdad.
August 30: A suicide bomber killed 11 people in a town south of Baghdad.
August 31: Two suicide bombers killed 10 people in Ramadi.

September 
September 1: A suicide bombing killed 37 people in western Iraq.
September 4: A car bomb and a suicide bomber killed at least 20 people and injured dozens in Baghdad.
September 8: A double suicide attack killed 9 people and injured 70 others in a town north of Baghdad.
September 10: A wave of terrorist bombings killed at least 30 people in Baghdad.
September 11: A wave of terrorist incidents killed at least 17 people and wounded 50.
September 17: A suicide car bomb killed 7 people and destroyed a bridge in Ramadi.
September 18: Two suicide bombings killed 13 people and injured 36 in Baghdad.
September 27: A car bomb killed 10 people and wounded 24 others.

October 
October 7:  A suicide bomber rammed a vehicle into houses used by Shiite militiamen north of the city of Samarra, killing at least 17 people.
October 9: A suicide attack killed 10 people in Baquba.
October 12: A series of terrorist bombings in Baghdad including a suicide attack killed more than 50 people. A wave of bombings in Baquba killed 31 people and wounded 70 others.
October 14: A suicide attack in Baghdad killed 19 people and wounded 35 others.
October 16: Three car bombs in Baghdad killed 16 people and wounded 48 others.
October 18: A series of car bombs in Baghdad killed 24 people.
October 19: A suicide bombing targeting Shiites in Baghdad killed 19 people and injured more than 2 dozens.
October 20: A wave of bombings targeting Shiites killed more than 43 people.
October 22: Two car bombs in Baghdad killed 16 people and wounded 65 others.
October 27: A similar attack killed 27 fighters and wounded 60 others. Another bombing in Baghdad killed 14 people and wounded 23 others.
October 31: A series of bombings killed 15 people near Baghdad.

November 
November 1: A series of terrorist bombings killed 24 people and wounded dozens in Baghdad.
November 7: A suicide bomber killed a police general and wounded 9 policemen in Baiji.
November 8: A series of car bombings killed 40 people and wounded dozens across Iraq.
November 16: A series of bombings in Baghdad killed 5 people and wounded 20 others.
November 19: A suicide attack in Erbil killed 6 people and wounded more than 20 others.
November 23: A car bomb killed 7 people and wounded 16 others in a town south of Baghdad.

December 
December 4: A series of bombs killed 35 people in Baghdad and Kirkuk.
December 24: A suicide bomber killed 26 people and wounded 56 others south of Baghdad.

See also 
List of terrorist incidents in January–June 2014
List of terrorist incidents in July–December 2014
Timeline of the Iraq War (2014)
Terrorist incidents in Iraq in 2015
Terrorist incidents in Iraq in 2013
List of bombings during the Iraqi insurgency (2011–2013)

References 

 
2014 in Iraq
Iraq
2014